Mahboubeh is a feminine given name. People with the name include:

Mahboubeh Abbasgholizadeh (born 1958), Iranian women's rights activist, researcher and film-maker
Mahboubeh Honarian (born 1962), Iranian-Canadian documentary filmmaker

Persian feminine given names